Tom Hewitt (born 1 October 1985) is an Australian former professional rugby league footballer who played in the NRL competition for the St George Illawarra Dragons.

Playing career
Hewitt made his first grade debut in round 14, 2007 with the St George Illawarra Dragons against the Parramatta Eels with Parramatta snatching a 20-12 win and Hewitt scoring a try.

Hewitt revealed on 8 August 2007 that he had signed with the Brisbane Broncos for the 2008 season but made no appearances for the club.

References

External links
 

1985 births
Australian rugby league players
St. George Illawarra Dragons players
Central Queensland Capras players
Rugby league wingers
Rugby league fullbacks
Living people
Rugby league players from Queensland